Ramon Khino "RK" S. Bagatsing (born May 9, 1988) is a Filipino film and television actor. Bagatsing is most notable for the role of Arnaldo Ardiente Torillo in the ABS-CBN primetime series Wildflower.

Early life
Bagatsing is the son of actor Ramon "Boy" Bagatsing, Jr. and Marilou San Diego. He is the younger brother of actor Raymond Bagatsing and actress Monina Bagatsing. Bagatsing's paternal grandfather is the former Manila City Mayor Ramon Bagatsing, the city's longest-serving mayor.

Career
Bagatsing has been nominated for acting awards for his roles in Apocalypse Child and Slumber Party. Outside his filming roles, he has also dabbled in television appearing in episodes of Wagas and Ipaglaban Mo!.

In 2018, he was part of ABS-CBN's initial drama offering and Afternoon TV Series Araw Gabi, with JM de Guzman and he played the trending Primetime TV Series Wildflower as Mayor Arnaldo Ardiente Torillo; with actress Maja Salvador.

Filmography

Television

Films

References

External links
 

Living people
Filipino people of Indian descent
21st-century Filipino male actors
1988 births
RK Bagatsing
People from Tondo, Manila
Star Magic
ABS-CBN personalities
TV5 (Philippine TV network) personalities